Paraptila bloomfieldi is a species of moth of the family Tortricidae. It is found along the western coast of central Mexico (Colima, Jalisco, Guerrero)

The length of the forewings is 4.9-5.9 mm for males and 5.5-6.5 mm for females. The ground colour of the forewings is dark brown with scattered red-brown scales in the basal area, followed by a white to light tan band. There is also a silver-white patch bordering the costa. The distal part of the wing is brown, but lighter towards dorsum. The hindwings are grey brown.

References

Moths described in 1991
Euliini